The Irish Wikipedia is the Irish-language version of Wikipedia, run by the Wikimedia Foundation and established in October 2003, with the first article being written in January 2004. 
The founder of Vicipéid was Gabriel Beecham. In September 2005 over 1600 articles had been written, with 173 contributors (both regular and irregular) having written material. By March 2007, about 20 regular Wikipedians were writing articles, with up to 7,000 articles having been created. In February 2021, it was just under the 55,000 article mark, making it the 94th largest Wikipedia by article count.

The Vicipéid now encompasses a wide range of subjects, including topics as diverse as philosophy, genetics, Aboriginal bark canoes, and maritime terminology.  The Vicipéid draws (with permission) directly from Fréamh an Eolais, an Irish-language encyclopedia of science and technology, written by Matt Hussey.

Evaluation 
The Vicipéid has been favourably received by some Irish-language media.
In his paper on Putting the learning back into learning technology, Barry McMullin of Dublin City University suggested that while the Irish Wikipedia is never likely to contain as many articles as the Wikipedias in the world's most widespread languages, it is still a useful resource.

Other academic sources have emphasised the site's educational value. The role of the Vicipéid as an educational tool at tertiary level has been acknowledged in the context of Wikimedia use, involving projects supported by University of Galway.

See also
 Tuairisc.ie
Welsh Wikipedia

References

External links

Vicipéid 
Irish Wikipedia mobile version (not fully supported) 
Statistics for Irish Wikipedia by Erik Zachte

Internet properties established in 2003
Irish encyclopedias
Irish-language websites
Wikipedias by language
Wikipedias in Celtic languages